Waves is the seventh album by Norwegian jazz guitarist Terje Rypdal recorded in 1977 and released on the ECM label.

Reception
The Allmusic review by Michael P. Dawson awarded the album 4 stars stating "This contains some of Rypdal's jazziest music".

Track listing
All compositions by Terje Rypdal except as indicated
 "Per Ulv" - 8:37 
 "Karusell" - 8:12 
 "Stenskoven" (Palle Mikkelborg) - 3:49 
 "Waves" - 5:42 
 "The Dain Curse" - 8:45 
 "Charisma" - 6:15
Recorded at Talent Studio in Oslo, Norway in September 1977

Personnel
Terje Rypdal — electric guitar, synthesizer, RMI keyboard computer
Palle Mikkelborg — trumpet, tack piano, RMI keyboard computer, ring modulator
Sveinung Hovensjø — 6 & 4 string electric bass
Jon Christensen — drums, percussion

References

ECM Records albums
Terje Rypdal albums
1978 albums
Albums produced by Manfred Eicher